Alfred Earl "Al" Hansen (5 October 1927 – 20 June 1995) was an American artist. He was a member of Fluxus, a movement that originated on an artists' collective around George Maciunas.

He was the father of Andy Warhol protégé Bibbe Hansen and the grandfather and artistic mentor of rock musician Beck and artist Channing Hansen. Bibbe and Channing continue his legacy by performing some of his most iconic works.

Biography
Born in New York City, Al Hansen was a friend to Yoko Ono and John Cage. While serving in Germany in World War II, Hansen pushed a piano off the roof of a five-story building. This act became the foundation of one of his most recognized performance pieces, the Yoko Ono Piano Drop. Many artists have also destroyed or altered pianos including John Cage, Joseph Beuys, Nam June Paik and Raphael Montañez Ortiz.

Hansen studied with composer John Cage at the now famous 1958 Composition Class at the New School for Social Research in New York City along with fellow students, Dick Higgins, George Brecht, and Allan Kaprow amongst others. Hansen was a frequent visitor to The Factory, Andy Warhol's studio in New York. Hansen was perhaps best known for his performance pieces, his participation in Happenings, and for his collages in which he often used cigarette butts and candy bar wrappers as the raw materials, among them numerous variations of a sculpture referring to the Venus of Willendorf.

He wrote an important book about performance art, A Primer of Happenings and Time Space Art published by Something Else Press in 1965.

In 1966 he attended the Destruction in Art Symposium in London organized by Gustav Metzger, where he met and befriended many of the Viennese Action Artists. In October 1966 Otto Muhl organized an event called "Action Concert for Al Hansen" in Vienna.

He was an art professor at Rutgers College in Newark, New Jersey, into the 1970s.

In 1977 Hansen managed Los Angeles punk bands the Controllers and the Screamers in Hollywood. In the 1980s Hansen moved to Cologne, Germany, where he and colleague Lisa Cieslik  established an art school, the Ultimate Akademie. Inspired among others by the Final Academy of Genesis P-Orridge it became a meeting point for local and international performers of the time-based arts.

He died in Cologne, Germany, in 1995, with a number of friends celebrating a Fluxus funeral according to his plan.

Notable collections
Archivio Conz - Francesco Conz's Collection 
Yes She He, c. 1962, Hirshhorn Museum and Sculpture Garden, Washington, D.C.
Coco Was a Poco Loco about Cacao and Men, 1968, MoMA, New York, NY
John Cage Word Opera, 1972–1076, Walker Art Center Minneapolis, MN
Amazone Venus 3/9 1994, Kölnisches Stadtmuseum.
Yayoi Kusama's Yokohama Hammock 1963, Museum Moderner Kunst Stiftung Ludwig Wien Vienna.

References
 René Block, Gabriele Knapstein: 'A long story with many knots. Fluxus in Germany 1962–1994.' (Eine lange Geschichte mit vielen Knoten. Fluxus in deutschland.) Institute for foreign relations (Institut für Auslandsbeziehungen), Stuttgart, Germany, 1995

External links
Al Hansen website
designboom: Al Hansen
Maciunas on Fluxus and Hansen's part therein, George Maciunas's Seattle Interview

1927 births
1995 deaths
Artists from New York City
Fluxus
American people of Norwegian descent
People associated with The Factory